Coad is a surname. Notable people with the surname include:

Basil Coad (1906–1980), senior British Army officer
Ben Coad (born 1994), English cricketer 
Conal Coad, opera singer
Frank Coad (born 1930), Australian racing driver
Jez Coad, British record producer and musician
Joyce Coad (1917–1987), American child actress
Matthew Coad (disambiguation), several people
Merwin Coad (born 1924), American politician from Iowa
Michael Coad, Australian football player
Paddy Coad (1920–1992), Irish football player and manager
Peter Coad (born 1953), software entrepreneur and author
Richard Coad (1825–1900), British architect from Cornwall